Accounting Perspectives (French: Perspectives comptables) is an academic journal published by Wiley-Blackwell on behalf of The Canadian Academic Accounting Association.  Accounting Perspectives is a peer-reviewed journal that provides new insights in Canadian accounting research, policy, and education. The journal publishes applied research, literature reviews, commentary, educational articles, and instructional cases that speak from and speak to the accounting community in Canada. Submissions may refer to data, resources, literature, or other materials outside the Canadian landscape. However, authors must be able to demonstrate the relevance of their work to the Canadian context.

The journal was established in 2002 as Canadian Accounting Perspectives and obtained its current title in 2007. Also in 2007, Accounting Perspectives took over the publication of accounting cases previously offered by Journal of Accounting Case Research. The last issue of the latter journal (volume 9, issue 2) was published by Captus Press and the University of Lethbridge.

Accounting Perspectives is abstracted and indexed in Scopus.

References

External links
 
 The Canadian Academic Accounting Association

Accounting journals
Publications established in 2002
Wiley-Blackwell academic journals
Quarterly journals
Multilingual journals
Academic journals associated with learned and professional societies